The fifth electoral unit of the Federation of Bosnia and Herzegovina is a parliamentary constituency used to elect members to the House of Representatives of the Federation of Bosnia and Herzegovina since 2000.  Located within Zenica-Doboj Canton, it consists of the municipalities of Doboj Jug, Maglaj, Tešanj, Usora, Zavidovići, Zenica, and Žepče.

Demographics

Representatives

References

Constituencies of Bosnia and Herzegovina